Bârna is a commune in Timiș County, Romania. It is composed of seven villages: Bârna (commune seat), Botești, Botinești, Drinova, Jurești, Pogănești and Sărăzani.

Geography 
Located in the Săraz Valley, surrounded by forests, with villages located some on hills, others along the water, Bârna is one of the communes in the east of Timiș County and borders Fârdea to the east, Lugoj to the west, Traian Vuia to the north and Criciova and Nădrag to the south. 

Bârna is crossed by several streams, the most important being Săraz, Verdea, Finodia and Scăioasa.

History 
The first recorded mention of Bârna dates from 1514, when it belonged to the family of George of Brandenburg-Ansbach, heir of the Hunyadis. Most likely, Bârna was also owned by the Hunyadi family, as well as the other villages in the district of Bujor, as it was called then. The village was part of Timiș County, sometimes of Hunedoara County, and from the Middle Ages it was permanently inhabited. In 1771 Bârna is mentioned as belonging to the district of Făget, with 90 houses. The population was predominantly Romanian. In the hearth of the village there was also the settlement of Peperig, also mentioned in 1514. 

During 1970–1980, in Bârna and in the neighboring villages (Pogănești, Știuca, etc.), Ukrainians who came to work in forest exploitation and wood processing began to settle here.

Demographics 

Bârna had a population of 1,640 inhabitants at the 2011 census, up 4% from the 2002 census. Most inhabitants are Romanians (69.39%), with a minority of Ukrainians (27.32%). For 3.17% of the population, ethnicity is unknown. By religion, most inhabitants are Orthodox (83.05%), but there are also minorities of Adventists (8.05%), Pentecostals (3.6%) and Baptists (1.59%). For 3.23% of the population, religious affiliation is unknown.

References 

Communes in Timiș County
Localities in Romanian Banat
Ukrainian communities in Romania